Muriyad  is a village in Mukundapuram taluk Thrissur district in the state of Kerala, India.

History
It is one of the  villages formed out of the old Thazhekkad proverti. Anandapuram village comes under muriyad gramapanchayat.
Parekkattukara and Vezhakkattukara are ul_desoms of Muriyad village.  Kunnathara is the most historic place which consists kunnathrukkovu Siva temple and Sastha temple. Puvasserikavu Bhagavathi temple, Vattaparambu Siva vishnu temple, Kandankulangara Durga temple are also known.
Global Head quarters of Church of Light Emperor Emmanuel Zion (C.L.E.E.Z) an independent Christian church is situated on Zion Campus, Muriyad.

Demographics
 India census, Muriyad had a population of 6885 with 3237 males and 3648 females.

References

Villages in Mukundapuram Taluk